This is a list of cyclists who competed at the 2016 Summer Olympics in Rio de Janeiro, Brazil. The cyclists were competing in 18 cycling events in the disciplines: BMX, mountain biking, road cycling, and track cycling.

2016 Olympic cyclists

 
2016
Olympic, 2016}
Cyclists, 2016